Heart and Soul: The Very Best of T'Pau is a compilation album by British pop group T'Pau, which was released by Virgin Records in 1993. It reached number 35 on the UK Albums Chart and remained in the top 100 for two weeks.

The compilation's title was based on the band's successful debut single "Heart and Soul".

Track listing

Personnel
T'Pau
 Carol Decker – lead vocal
 Dean Howard – lead guitar
 Ronnie Rogers – rhythm guitar
 Michael Chetwood – keyboard
 Paul Jackson – bass guitar
 Tim Burgess – percussion

Additional musicians
 Gary Barnacle – saxophone on "Road to Our Dream", "This Girl" and "China in Your Hand"

Production
 Roy Thomas Baker – producer (tracks 1–2, 5–12)
 Andy Richards – producer (tracks 3–4)
 Stephen W. Tayler – mixing (tracks 5, 7–9)
 Ian Taylor – mixing (track 4)
 Chris Lord-Alge – mixing (track 3)

Sleeve
 Bill Smith Studio – design
 Mike Owen – front cover photography
 Tony McGee – inner photography

Charts

References

External links

1993 compilation albums
T'Pau (band) albums
Albums produced by Roy Thomas Baker
Virgin Records compilation albums